David Imms  (born 1945) is an English artist and painter.

Imms was born near Derby and studied at Derby College of Art (1962–64) and at Central School of Art and Design, London (1964–67).

He has had numerous one-man exhibitions and his work is widely represented in private and public collections including the Victoria and Albert Museum, University of London, Queen Mary College London, Derby Museum and Art Gallery and Plymouth City Museum and Art Gallery.

His work is influenced by the West Country landscape and reflects literary and historical associations, such as Thomas Hardy's  Dorset, and the prehistoric earthworks and standing stones of Wiltshire.

Awarded the Northern Arts Purchase Award and Llewellyn Smith Scholarship.
Imms lives and works in Finedon, Northamptonshire.

References

Further reading
Frances Spalding, 20th Century Painters and Sculptors, Woodbridge: Antique Collectors Club 1990, p. 265  
Alan Windsor (ed.), Handbook of Modern British Painting 1900-1980, Aldershot: Scolar Press 1992, p. 150  

Alumni of the University of Derby
Alumni of the Central School of Art and Design
Living people
1945 births
English contemporary artists
20th-century British painters
British male painters
21st-century British painters
People from Derby
People from Finedon
20th-century British male artists
21st-century British male artists